Road Raja is a reality television game show that aired on Sky One from 29 August to 3 October 2004. Set in Mumbai, the series followed six celebrities as they completed a number of driving tasks in and around the city, culminating in the Road Raja Grand Prix - a mad dash around the city.

The Celebrities
 Julie Goodyear
 Keith Allen
 Caprice Bourret
 Dennis Waterman
 Tania Strecker
 Russell Amerasekera

Note: Keith Allen left during the third episode due to a family emergency and therefore did not complete the rest of the series or compete in the Grand Prix.

Presenter
The series was hosted by comedian, actor, dancer and Bollywood film star Javed Jaffrey.

Music
The theme tune was composed and performed by Keith Allen. The show also features various examples of Indian music, in conjunction with its setting.

The Race
In the final episode the celebs competed in the Road Raja Grand Prix - where they had to complete a tour of Mumbai over 5 stages. At the end of each stage was an iconic landmark and the celebs had to have their picture taken by a member of the public to prove they had reached the destination.

The final order of the race was:
 1st - Caprice Bourret
 2nd - Tania Strecker
 3rd - Dennis Waterman
 4th - Russell Amerasekera

Note: Julie Goodyear did not finish the race because of a crash - she did not suffer any injuries and was not driving the car at the time - her navigator was. A common theme throughout the series was Julie's ability to get others - usually locals - to drive her vehicles for her. After the race she was also disqualified.

External links

Sky UK original programming
2004 British television series debuts
2004 British television series endings
Television shows set in Mumbai